Squash Canada is the national sport association responsible for the development of athletes, coaches and officials in Canada. Founded in 1915, Squash Canada sets the Canadian standards for Squash and works with partners to promote the growth and development of the sport across the country.

Organization
Squash Canada (108075714rr0001) was registered with Canadian Revenue Agency as a Canadian amateur athletic association (RCAAA); therefore, they can issue official donation receipts and are eligible to receive gifts from registered charities since 1983-01-01.

See also
 Canada men's national squash team
 Canada women's national squash team

References

External links
 www.squash.ca/

Sports governing bodies in Canada
Squash in Canada
Sports organizations established in 1915
Organizations based in Ottawa
Canada
1915 establishments in Ontario